Stuttgart is a city in and the county seat of the northern district of Arkansas County, Arkansas, United States. Established by German settlers, it was named for its larger German counterpart. Known as the "Rice and Duck Capital of the World", the city is an international destination for waterfowl hunting along the Mississippi Flyway. Stuttgart is the most important city on the Arkansas Grand Prairie, a region known for rice cultivation. The economy is largely based on agricultural production, waterfowl tourism, and supporting industries. As of the 2010 census it had a population of 9,326.

Stuttgart is also on the Union Pacific Railroad between Memphis, Tennessee, and Pine Bluff, Arkansas.

History 
Stuttgart was founded by Reverend Adam Bürkle, a native of Plattenhardt in Germany. He moved to the United States in 1852 and founded a settlement at Gum Pond after living in Ohio. In 1880, he opened a post office and thus had to name the village. In honor of his home he named it after Stuttgart, then capital of the Kingdom of Württemberg. In 1882, the Texas and St. Louis railroad was opened. Stuttgart became a city in 1884, and in 1904, rice farming was first introduced in the Stuttgart area. Stuttgart's first Postmaster General was a black man named Martin Toms, according to the US Census.

It became a dual county seat in Arkansas County with DeWitt in the 1920s.

Geography
Stuttgart and Arkansas County are located in the Arkansas Delta (in Arkansas, usually referred to as "the Delta") a subregion of the Mississippi Alluvial Plain, which is a flat area consisting of rich, fertile sediment deposits from the Mississippi River between Louisiana and Illinois.

Within the Delta, Arkansas County is almost entirely within the Grand Prairie subregion, historically a flat grassland plain underlain by an impermeable clay layer (the Stuttgart soil series). Prior to the 19th century, flatter areas with slowly to very slowly permeable soils (often containing fragipans) supported Arkansas's largest prairie, covered in prairie grasses and forbs, with oaks covering the low hills and ridges, and pockets of floodplains with bottomland hardwood forests. This region was a sharp contrast to the bottomland forests that once dominated other parts of the Mississippi Alluvial Plain. Cropland has now largely replaced the native vegetation. Distinctively, rice is the main crop; soybeans, cotton, corn, and wheat are also grown. The rice fields provide habitat and forage for large numbers and many species of waterfowl; duck and goose hunting occurs at this important spot along the Mississippi Flyway. Stuttgart is the most important city within the Grand Prairie region.

Stuttgart is located at  (34.497043, -91.550917).

Climate
The climate in this area is characterized by hot, humid summers and generally mild to cool winters.  According to the Köppen Climate Classification system, Stuttgart has a humid subtropical climate, abbreviated "Cfa" on climate maps.

Demographics

2020 census

As of the 2020 United States census, there were 8,264 people, 3,607 households, and 2,197 families residing in the city.

2010 census
As of the 2010 United States Census, there were 9,326 people living in the city. 58.7% were White, 36.5% African American, 0.2% Native American, 0.7% Asian, 2.4% from other races and 1.4% from two or more races. 3.5% were Hispanic or Latino of any race.

2000 census
As of the census of 2000, there were 9,745 people, 3,994 households, and 2,731 families living in the city. The racial makeup of the city was 64.0% white or Caucasian, 34.5% black or African American, 0.6% Asian, 0.01% Pacific Islander, 0.2% Native American, 0.2% from other races, and 0.5% from two or more races. 0.8% of the population were Hispanic or Latino of any race.

There were 3,994 households, out of which 31.6% had children under the age of 18 living with them, 48.0% were married couples living together, 16.7% had a female householder with no husband present, and 31.6% were non-families. 28.4% of all households were made up of individuals, and 12.6% had someone living alone who was 65 years of age or older. The average household size was 2.40 and the average family size was 2.94.

In the city, the population was spread out, with 26.0% under the age of 18, 8.8% from 18 to 24, 26.0% from 25 to 44, 23.0% from 45 to 64, and 16.2% who were 65 years of age or older. The median age was 38 years. For every 100 females, there were 86.8 males. For every 100 females age 18 and over, there were 81.2 males.

The median income for a household in the city was $31,664, and the median income for a family was $39,126. Males had a median income of $30,860 versus $21,817 for females. The per capita income for the city was $16,490. About 13.8% of families and 18.2% of the population were below the poverty line, including 25.7% of those under age 18 and 17.3% of those age 65 or over.

Economy

Stuttgart is home to Mack's Prairie Wings, known around the world as the premier waterfowl sports outfitter, through their store and online presence. During the third week in November (Thanksgiving Week), Stuttgart holds the World Championship Duck Calling Contest that brings in people of all ages from around the world to show off their talent using a duck call.

Riceland Foods, a farmer-owned agricultural marketing cooperative and world's largest miller and marketer of rice, is headquartered in Stuttgart.

Producers Rice Mill, another farmer-owned agricultural marketing cooperative that is also among the largest millers and marketers of rice is also headquartered in Stuttgart.

Lennox Industries - Stuttgart has a Lennox Air Conditioner factory.

Stratton Seed - Stuttgart is home to Stratton Seed, a large marketer of soybeans and soybean seed.

Layne Arkansas - Stuttgart is home to Layne Arkansas, a business that installs water pumping wells to irrigate farms, and also installs city water systems.

Baptist Hospital - Stuttgart also has a branch of the Baptist Hospital Group which serves a large part of Arkansas.  The Stuttgart Baptist Hospital is a central hospital for much of the surrounding region - - Arkansas County, Prairie County, Monroe County, Western Phillips, Northern Jefferson County, and Eastern Lonoke County.  It is one of the largest employers in Stuttgart.

The University of Arkansas' Dale Bumpers Rice Research Center, about seven miles east of Stuttgart, employs a team of scientific researchers who breed new varieties of rice, and is one of the biggest employers in the area.

Delta Plastics of the South is a manufacturer of plastic irrigation tubes used for watering crops.  These tubes are a replacement for more rigid plastic or aluminum pipe systems that used to be used to irrigate.  One of Delta Plastics' manufacturing plants is located in Stuttgart, and is a big employer in the area.

Education 
Public education for elementary and secondary school students is primarily provided by Stuttgart Public Schools, which leads to graduation from Stuttgart High School.

Stuttgart also has Saint John's Lutheran Elementary School, and Holy Rosary Catholic Elementary School (of the Roman Catholic Diocese of Little Rock), and Grand Prairie Christian School.

Stuttgart also has a branch of Phillips County Community College, a two-year junior college (that also has campuses in Helena and DeWitt), which is part of the University of Arkansas System.

Arts and culture

Stuttgart is home to the Museum of the Arkansas Grand Prairie which has displays celebrating the history of Stuttgart, and the surrounding Grand Prairie area.

The Grand Prairie Center on the campus of Phillips County Community College in Stuttgart brings in performances by live bands, and stage plays a handful of times each year.

Annual cultural events
There is an annual Wings Over The Prairie Festival every November, from Wednesday through Saturday, during Thanksgiving week.  The festival features the World's Championship Duck Calling Contest, carnival rides, craft tents, and a Queen Mallard Pageant, all celebrating duck hunting which is Stuttgart's biggest tourist attraction.

There is an annual German Heritage Festival.

There is also an annual Arts Festival held in the Grand Prairie Center on the campus of Phillips County Community College in Stuttgart.

Recreation
Many people in the Stuttgart area are big high school football fans, and can be found on Friday nights, in the Fall, supporting their Stuttgart Ricebirds high school football team which has won several Arkansas state championships during the last seventy-five years.

Infrastructure

Healthcare 
Stuttgart and the surrounding area are served by Baptist Health Medical Center-Stuttgart, a 49-bed acute care facility. The facility originally opened in 1957 under the name Stuttgart Memorial Hospital, then became Stuttgart Regional Medical Center. It took its current name in 2007 when it became part of the Baptist Health System based in Little Rock, Arkansas.

Transportation
Stuttgart is located at the intersection of three north-south United States highways: US Highway 63 (US 63), US 79, and US 165. The city is also served by US 79 Business (US 79B), Highway 130 (AR 130), AR 146 Spur (AR 146S), and AR 276.

In popular culture 

The 1989 movie Rosalie Goes Shopping, directed by Percy Adlon and starring Marianne Sägebrecht, was set in Stuttgart.

The city drew media attention during the sixth cycle of America's Next Top Model in the spring of 2006 when Stuttgart resident Furonda Brasfield was featured among the contestants.

A tornado that struck Stuttgart on the evening of Mother's Day; May 10, 2008; was featured on the November 9, 2008 episode of Storm Chasers on the Discovery Channel.

Some scenery in Stuttgart appears in the 2007 movie Shotgun Stories, starring Michael Shannon, directed by Jeff Nichols, which was also filmed in England, Arkansas and North Little Rock.

Some scenery in Stuttgart also appears in the 2012 movie Mud starring Matthew McConaughey and Reese Witherspoon, and directed by Jeff Nichols.  Mud was also filmed around DeWitt, Dumas, and Casscoe.

Notable people

 Douglas A. Blackmon, Pulitzer Prize-winning author of Slavery by Another Name, born in Stuttgart
 John Dillon, founding member of the rock band Ozark Mountain Daredevils, which had the hits "Jackie Blue" and "If You Wanna Get to Heaven" during the 1970s, attended Stuttgart Public Schools.
Fonda Hawthorne, Democratic member of the Arkansas House of Representatives from Little River County; born in Stuttgart in 1956
Oren O'Neal, Former NFL Fullback; Oakland Raiders Team Rookie of the Year 2007.

References

Further reading

External links 
 
 Stuttgart Chamber of Commerce
 Stuttgart 72160 Photos at TrekEarth
 "Stuttgart"  at Arkansas.com
 "Stuttgart, Arkansas" at City-Data.com
 "Stuttgart" at Local.Arkansas.gov
 Stuttgart Daily Leader
 Stuttgart, Arkansas entry on the Encyclopedia of Arkansas History & Culture
 Baptist Health Medical Center - Stuttgart 
 "Riceland Farmers" at Riceland.coop
 Riceland Foods" at Riceland.com
 Sanborn maps of Stuttgart at Wikimedia

Cities in Arkansas County, Arkansas
County seats in Arkansas
German-American culture in Arkansas
Populated places established in 1880
1880 establishments in Arkansas
Cities in Arkansas